Eve Caesar was a Trinidadian cricketer who played as a left-handed batter. She appeared in six One Day Internationals for the West Indies, all at the 1993 World Cup. She made her ODI high score in her final match, scoring 78 against Ireland. She played domestic cricket for Trinidad and Tobago.

In February 2019, Caesar was recognized as an "Icon" in the field of cricket at the Trinidad and Tobago Division of Sport and Youth Affairs annual Sports Awards Ceremony of 2018.

References

External links
 
 

2002 deaths
Date of birth missing
Year of birth missing
West Indian women cricketers
West Indies women One Day International cricketers
Trinidad and Tobago women cricketers